Lamont Bertrell Hollinquest (born October 24, 1970) is a former American football linebacker in the National Football League for the Washington Redskins and the Green Bay Packers.  He played college football at the University of Southern California.

Early years 
Hollinquest attended Pius X High School in Downey, California.  After spending a year at a junior college to get his academics up, he played college football at USC , Hollinquest started his career as a safety but then moved to linebacker after an influx of recruits and transfers as a senior. It is widely believed Hollinquest introduced USC QB Todd Marinovich to social drugs while they were roommates at USC.

Professional career

Washington Redskins 
Hollinquest was drafted by the Washington Redskins in the eighth round (212th pick overall) of the 1993 NFL Draft. In his two years with Washington, Hollinquest recorded 22 tackles and an interception. The Redskins waived him near the end of the 1994 season.

Cincinnati Bengals 
Hollinquest was picked up by the Cincinnati Bengals in time for their December 21, 1994, game, but was inactive and was later cut before the 1995 season started.

Green Bay Packers 
Following a tryout, Hollinquest played for the Green Bay Packers starting in the 1996 season. He immediately made an impact on special teams, finishing the year with 15 tackles. He was part of the Packers' Super Bowl XXXI championship team. Hollinquest continued to get more playing time throughout his career in Green Bay, with his tackles increasing each year. The Packers did not re-sign Hollinquest after the 1998 season. After he was cut by the Chiefs, the Packers signed Hollinquest in August 1999 due to a lack of depth at linebacker and the retirement of Robert Brooks. After the NFL suspended Hollinquest for the first four games of the season due to substance abuse problems, the Packers cut Hollinquest on August 30, 1999.

Kansas City Chiefs 
The Kansas City Chiefs signed Hollinquest in March 1999. He was waived before training camp began.

Post-career life 
On February 8, 2013, Hollinquest was arrested in Maricopa County, Arizona for narcotic drug possession and use, possession and use of drug paraphernalia and driving with a suspended/revoked license.
He has three kids, Chaz, Courtney and Kohl.

References

1970 births
Living people
Players of American football from Los Angeles
American football linebackers
USC Trojans football players
Washington Redskins players
Green Bay Packers players
Sportspeople from Downey, California